Harrison Samuel Francis (October 26, 1913 – April 23, 2002) was an American football player and coach, Olympic shot putter, and Army officer.

Biography
Francis was born in Dunbar, Nebraska, and graduated from high school in Oberlin, Kansas.

He played college football at the University of Nebraska-Lincoln, where, in 1936, he was the runner-up for the Heisman Trophy. Francis was also an exceptional athlete in track and field and placed fourth in the shot put at the 1936 Summer Olympics.

Francis was the first overall selection in the 1937 NFL Draft by the Philadelphia Eagles. His rights were traded to the Chicago Bears in exchange for Bill Hewitt and $4,000 in cash on February 15, 1937. He played in the NFL for four years with the Bears, Pittsburgh Pirates, and Brooklyn Dodgers before leaving to get a master's degree at the University of Iowa and serve in the Army during World War II.

After gaining experience serving as head coach for the football team at Camp Lee during World War II, Francis was hired as the head football coach at Kansas State University for the 1947 season. Francis coached at Kansas State for one year, compiling a record of 0–10.

Francis remained in the Army, serving in Korea and Vietnam, and held the rank of lieutenant colonel upon retirement. He is buried in Springfield National Cemetery.

Coaching career
Francis served as the 21st head football coach at Kansas State University, helming the team for the 1947 season. He is the only Kansas State football coach to lose every game that he coached. The program's first coach, Ira Pratt, was winless in his one season in 1896, but tallied one tie for a record of 0–1–1. Francis' 1947 Kansas State squad was outscored 283 to 71, and was shut out on three occasions. Their closest contest was a two-point loss to New Mexico at home, and their most lopsided defeat was a 55–0 rout by rival Kansas.

Head coaching record

Athletic honors
Francis was inducted into the College Football Hall of Fame and the Kansas Sports Hall of Fame.

References

Sources
 Lyons, Robert S. (2010). On Any Given Sunday, A Life of Bert Bell. Philadelphia: Temple University Press.

External links
 Nebraska profile
 
 
 

1913 births
2002 deaths
All-American college football players
American football fullbacks
American football halfbacks
American male shot putters
Brooklyn Dodgers (NFL) players
Chicago Bears players
Kansas State Wildcats football coaches
Nebraska Cornhuskers football players
Nebraska Cornhuskers men's track and field athletes
Pittsburgh Pirates (football) players
College Football Hall of Fame inductees
National Football League first-overall draft picks
Athletes (track and field) at the 1936 Summer Olympics
Olympic track and field athletes of the United States
United States Army officers
United States Army personnel of the Korean War
United States Army personnel of the Vietnam War
United States Army personnel of World War II
People from Oberlin, Kansas
People from Otoe County, Nebraska
Coaches of American football from Kansas
Players of American football from Kansas
Track and field athletes from Kansas
Track and field athletes in the National Football League